The 2020 Down Senior Football Championship was the 112th official edition of Down GAA's premier Gaelic Football tournament for senior clubs in County Down, with 16 teams competing. The tournament operated a double elimination format for the opening two rounds of the championship, with the winners and early round losers rejoining at the quarter final stage. 

Kilcoo were the holders after defeating Warrenpoint in the 2019 final.

Due to the impact of the COVID-19 pandemic on Gaelic games, relegation from the S.F.C. was not tied to this year's Down Football League. Instead, a Relegation Play-off was implemented within this year's S.F.C. format. Darragh Cross were relegated to the 2021 I.F.C. after losing their Relegation Play-Off. Saul will replace them after they claimed the 2020 I.F.C. title.

Team Changes
 

The following teams have changed division since the 2019 championship season.

To S.F.C.
Promoted from 2019 Down I.F.C.
 Glenn John Martin's  -  (I.F.C. Champions)
 Darragh Cross - (4th in Div. 2 F.L.; ranked 15th overall in Down F.L.)

From S.F.C.
Relegated to 2020 Down I.F.C.
 An Ríocht - (5th in Div. 2 F.L.; ranked 16th overall in Down F.L.)
 Saval - (8th in Div. 2 F.L.; ranked 19th overall in Down F.L.)

 –

Participating Teams
The following teams take part in the 2020 edition of the Down Senior Football Championship. –

 Ballyholland Harps (semi-final)
 Bryansford (quarter-final)
 Burren (Round 3)
 Carryduff (final)
 Clonduff (quarter-final)
 Kilcoo (champions) 
 Loughinisland (quarter-final)
 Mayobridge (Round 3)
 Rostrevor (quarter-final)
 Warrenpoint (semi-final)

 Bredagh (Round 3)
 Castlewellan (Round 2B)
 Darragh Cross (Round 2B)
 Glenn (Round 2B)
 Longstone (Round 3)
 RGU Downpatrick (Round 2B)

Round 1
The 16 participating teams were placed into an open draw. Winning sides moved to Round 2A while losing sides went into Round 2B.

Round 2

Round 2A
Round 2A featured the eight winning sides from Round 1, with an open draw to determine the fixtures. The winning sides progress directly to the quarter final, with the losing sides moving into Round 3.

Round 2B
Round 2B sees the eight losing sides from Round 1 compete for a place in Round 3. The losing sides from this round will be eliminated from the competition, and will have to play a relegation play-off to attempt to retain their Senior status for 2021.

Relegation Semi-finals
The 4 losers of Round 2B play each other in the Relegation Semi-finals. The 2 winners will secure their Senior status for 2021, while the 2 losers will face-off in the Relegation Final.

Relegation Final
The winner of the Relegation Final will maintain their Senior status into 2021, while the loser will be relegated to the 2021 Down I.F.C.

 Darragh Cross relegated to 2021 Down Intermediate Football Championship

Round 3
Round 3 is a supplementary round for teams to have a second chance at reaching the quarter final. This round features teams that have lost once so far in this year's Championship, either winning in Round 1 and losing in Round 2A, or losing in Round 1 but winning their Round 2B fixture. Losing sides in this round are eliminated from this year's competition.

This round is seeded, meaning in each fixture a Round 2A losing side will face a Round 2B winning side.

Quarter-final
The quarter final sees the two brackets rejoin, with the earlier Round 2A winners facing a Round 3 winner for a Semi Final spot.

Semi-final
The semi final will see the four winning sides face off for a place in this year's final. This round is an open draw from the four Quarter Final winners.

Final
The final was played between the two Semi Final winners, and took place at Páirc Esler, Newry.

References

External links
Down GAA

Down SFC
Down Senior Football Championship
Down Senior Football Championship